"My Man and the Devil on His Shoulder" is a song by Belgian-Turkish R&B singer Hadise. It is the third single released from her self-titled second studio album Hadise. It was released on 6 June 2008  with the release of her album. The song has yet to chart on the main ultratop chart, but has been on the ultratip chart for the past 3 weeks, where it is currently at number 11. This is her second release which has no music video, after her debut single "Sweat".

Subject matter
"My Man and the Devil on His Shoulder" refers to adultery. The song sees Hadise suspecting her lover is cheating on her: "I know I never really caught you, caught you in the act". As the song progresses, Hadise is still unsure whether her lover is cheating on her, stating: "There must be something, something on his shirt", but is aware how her lover is "nothing but a liar". As the song ends, the final verse has Hadise singing even though she hasn't found any evidence of her lover cheating she knows he is saying: "I ain't wasting my time, I'm outta here".

Track listing
Belgium CD & iTunes download (Europe)
"My Man and the Devil on His Shoulder" - 4:34
"A Song For My Mother" - 3:32

Charts

References

2008 singles
Hadise songs
English-language Belgian songs
Songs about infidelity
Songs written by Yves Jongen
2007 songs
Songs written by Hadise
EMI Records singles